Paging You was a BBC comedy series which debuted on 3 November 1946 and was subsequently cancelled in 1948.

Cast 

Bill Fraser (1948)
Richard Hearne (1947–1948)
Bobby Howes (1948)
Claude Hulbert (1948)
Humphrey Lestocq (1947)
Brian Reece (1946–1947)
Phyllis Robins (1946)
Enid Trevor (1948)

References

External links 
 

1946 British television series debuts
1948 British television series endings
1940s British comedy television series
British comedy television shows